C. rex  may refer to:
 Cattleya rex, an orchid species
 Chrysiptera rex, a damselfish species from the Indo-West Pacific
 Clytoceyx rex, the shovel-billed kookaburra or shovel-billed kingfisher, a large bird species endemic to New Guinea
 Comitas rex, a sea snail species

Dinosaur Specimens
C. rex, the largest specimen of Tyrannosaurus rex

See also
 Rex (disambiguation)